Neil Broad and Greg Van Emburgh were the defending champions, but none competed this year. Broad chose to compete at Cincinnati during the same week.

Jordi Arrese and Andrew Kratzmann won the title by defeating Pablo Albano and Federico Mordegan 7–6, 3–6, 6–2 in the final.

Seeds

Draw

Draw

References

External links
 Official results archive (ATP)
 Official results archive (ITF)

San Marino CEPU Open
1995 ATP Tour